The 1969 Chicago Bears season was their 50th regular season completed in the National Football League. The team finished with a franchise-worst 1–13 record. This occurred despite the exploits of Dick Butkus and Gale Sayers, who had torn the ligaments in his right knee in November 1968. After surgery, he went through a physical rehabilitation program with the help of teammate Brian Piccolo. In , Sayers led the league in rushing once again with 1,032 yards, but lacked his previous speed, and averaged only 4.4 yards per carry.

An already poor season was compounded in late November. Undersized fullback Piccolo had scored a touchdown in each of his final three games (November 2, 9, 16), but a persistent cough was diagnosed as cancer and he underwent chest surgery; he succumbed to the disease seven months later at age 26.

The Bears scored a total of only 27 points in 6 division games.

Offseason

Draft

Roster

Preseason 
On August 30, a crowd of 85,532 fans viewed a doubleheader at Cleveland's Municipal Stadium. In the first contest, the Bears played the AFL's Buffalo Bills, while the Cleveland Browns hosted the Green Bay Packers in the second match.

Regular season

Schedule

Standings

References 

Chicago Bears
Chicago Bears seasons
Chicago Bears